Ephebopus cyanognathus, known as the blue fang tarantula,  is a species of tarantula (family Theraphosidae). It is endemic to French Guiana. It was first described by Rick C. West and Samuel D Marshall in 2000, it is somewhat commonly kept as pets. As it common name may suggest, they have magnificent blue chelicerae, cyano meaning blue and gnathus being jaw. This tarantula being a burrowing spider, thought spiderlings of this species have been observed to be semi arboreal.

Description 
This tarantula looks a lot like the Ephebopus uatuman tarantula, the main distinguishing factor is the blue chelicerae, which is lacking in adult males. Adult males instead of owing the blue chelicerae they own a purplish color, even so they can be distinguished by their palpal bulb. This tarantula shows golden rings in their legs and pedipalps, which are present in the segmentations of such areas. In adults the carapace is brown in color with some yellowish-greenish areas, its opisthosoma is mainly brown-black with a greenish stripe in the center. 

While in juveniles and slings they have pinkish legs that stop in the metatarsus, which is purple in color. Its carapace is completely brown in slings, while in juveniles they have some yellowish-green coloring between the brown coloration. Its opisthosoma is green with a thick yellow line in the center. Juveniles own this yellow line, though its duller, and the opisthosoma is a brownish-greenish color.

Habitat 
These tarantulas are found all over French Guiana, they have been found from Trésor Reserve all the way to Saül. When describing their habitat I'll be mainly referring to Trésor Reserve, for the information. In this area it rains yearly about 4m in average, as this is because of the trade winds, which are loaded with humidity from the ocean.  In this area this area has 23ºC, with very high humidity levels.

Behavior 
This spider is mainly fossorial, but juveniles have been observed to oddly be semi arboreal. When they are young they are known to be defensive, and very nervous, but this gets better with age. When provoked this tarantula will first try to flee, but under persistent provocation it will throw hairs or bite. This tarantula will make burrows, though not as deep as other spiders, making the entrance stronger with whatever they may find, popping of a few centimeters of the surface.

References 

Theraphosidae
Spiders described in 2000
Spiders of South America
Taxa named by Rick C. West